The , also known as the Type 92 cavalry tank, was the Empire of Japan's first indigenous tankette. Designed for use by the cavalry of the Imperial Japanese Army by Ishikawajima Motorcar Manufacturing Company (currently Isuzu Motors), the Type 92 was designed for scouting and infantry support. Type 92 production was limited due to technical defects with the hull and its overall poor armament. Although actually a light tank, it was called sōkōsha (armored car) in Japanese due to political sectionalism within the Japanese Army (tanks were controlled by the infantry, whereas the new weapon was intended for the cavalry). Exactly the same device was used in America with the M1 Combat Car.

Developmental history
After World War I, many European countries attempted to mechanize their cavalry. In parallel, Japanese cavalry also experimented with a variety of armored cars with limited success. These wheeled armored cars were not suitable for most operations in Manchuria, due to the poor road conditions and severe winter climate. Japan's army (like the US, French, British and Russian armies) tried various methods to integrate modern armor into their traditional horse cavalry formations.

From the early 1920s, the Imperial Japanese Army Cavalry School based in Chiba prefecture tested a variety of European light tanks, including six Carden Loyd tankettes and several Renault FTs, and a decision was reached in 1929 to proceed with the domestic development of a new vehicle, based largely on the Carden Loyd design and intended to address the deficiencies of wheeled armored cars.

The development of the Type 92 began after the Japanese decided to develop a small vehicle in Japan for mobile operations. At first a hybrid amphibious car known as the Sumida Amphibious Armored Car (AMP) was tested in 1930. It had both tracks and wheels and was able to drive in forward and reverse, both in the water and on land. The AMP prototype was not entirely successful, and the Japanese cavalry was not impressed with the performance. The cavalry wanted a vehicle with greater power and better off-road capabilities. After this, the amphibious car concept was abandoned, and the design was changed to a tracked vehicle for land use only.

Production was initiated by Ishikawajima Motorcar Manufacturing Company. Production was plagued by technical problems and in total only 167 units were built between 1932 and 1939. The original suspension with six road wheels and three return rollers caused ongoing problems and it was redesigned. The later production series had four road wheels and two return rollers. The later version has sometime been mistakenly referred to as a "Type 93 light tank".

The Type 92 was eventually replaced by the Type 94 tankette during the Second Sino-Japanese War, although both British and American sources often confused the two models.

Armor and armament

The Type 92 used riveted and welded armor with a maximum thickness from 6 mm (in the hull) to 12 mm (in the turret). The thin armor kept the weight to three tons; however, it could be penetrated by machine gun fire. Although its armor was thinner and its weaponry much lighter than its European contemporaries, the Type 92 was only able to reach a speed of 40 km/h.

The armament consisted of two machine guns, one in the manually traversed turret and one in the hull. Early models had 6.5 mm Type 91 machine guns in both positions. Later, the hull-mounted weapon was replaced with a manually aimed 13 mm Type 92 heavy machine gun, license-built from Hotchkiss. The weapon had limited traverse, but included a pivoting eyepiece on the gunsight optics and a high-angle mount, allowing anti-aircraft use. The turret machine gun was replaced later by the 7.7 mm Type 97 light machine gun.

After production ended, efforts were made to improve the armament to keep the vehicle relevant on the battlefield. Attempts were also made in 1933 to mount a 37 mm tank gun in the hull of the vehicle to give it "anti-tank capabilities". It was determined to be "impractical" and therefore abandoned. The Type 98 20 mm machine cannon was successfully mounted on the hull of a number of the vehicles after 1937, in place of the 13.2 mm machine gun. In addition, an external anti-aircraft mount was stowed in the vehicle, which could be attached to the outer rear facing of the turret, allowing an additional Type 91 machine gun to be mounted. The engine hatches could be opened and locked together to form a seat for the gunner using the externally mounted machine gun.

Variants

There were three major production variants of the Type 92. The early wheeled prototype and the experimental amphibious tank (Type 92 A-I-Go) with a watertight hull, floats and propellers (only 2 built) eventually resulted in the early production model with two bogies on each side, each with two small rubber-lined road wheels. However, this model was superseded in production by a late production model with improved suspension, when combat experience showed that the early Type 92 tended to throw its tracks in high speed turns.

A Type 92 first production "early" model. Initial armament was two light 6.5 mm Type 91 machine guns, with one mounted in the turret and one in the hull. This was used by the IJA Cavalry division that took part in the attack of Harbin, 1932.

The re-armed early or "mid" production Type 92 included the 13.2 mm heavy machine gun in the hull. The first Special Tank Company of the 8th Division used it in the battle of Rehe, March 1933. The mid-production re-armed model allowed for some anti-air capability, increasing the utility of the vehicle.

The "late" Type 92 was deployed in Manchuria, April 1942. Modifications included a new drive train, new redesigned portholes and vision slits with different swing, a new light turret machine gun, the Type 96 re-barreled to 7.7 mm Type 99 ammunition. It continued to mount a 13.2 mm heavy machine gun in the hull.

Combat use

The Type 92 tankette was deployed primarily with the Kwantung Army in Manchuria and the Chosen Army in Korea. The Manchukuo Imperial Army also received 30 Type 92s.

Notable actions in which the Type 92 participated included the Battle of Harbin with the 1st Cavalry Brigade and the Battle of Rehe with the 1st Special Tank Company of the 8th Division.

Notes

References

External links

Taki's Imperial Japanese Army Page - Akira Takizawa

Isuzu
World War II tankettes
Tankettes of Japan
Reconnaissance vehicles
Reconnaissance vehicles of Japan
Reconnaissance vehicles of World War II
Tracked reconnaissance vehicles
Tankettes of the interwar period
History of the tank
Military vehicles introduced in the 1930s